Tillandsia bergeri is a species of plant in the genus Tillandsia. This species is native to Brazil.

Cultivars
 Tillandsia 'Bergos'
 Tillandsia 'Bob Whitman'

References

BSI Cultivar Registry Retrieved 11 October 2009

bergeri
Flora of Brazil